The Almost Complete Collection of True Singapore Ghost Stories (also True Singapore Ghost Stories or TSGS) is the bestselling book series in Singapore. With over 1.5 million copies sold, the series has become a household name since its inception in 1989. Russell Lee, a Singaporean author, compiles reports, stories and interviews about the supernatural. Light and entertaining, each book, which comprises about 30 stories, appeals to both children and mature readers. The latest book (26th book) in the series was released in 2020.

Most of the stories take place in Asia but some take place in other parts of the world. Lee also includes articles about the paranormal, featuring detailed investigations into the occult, witchcraft, vampires and other similar topics. The books are sold in Singapore, Malaysia, Indonesia and some other neighbouring countries.

Russell Lee is the author of the series. He has been writing about the supernatural since 1989.

Books
Below are a list of books published under the series:

Television Series
A 13-part TV series, True Singapore Ghost Stories, has been produced by I-Media Entertainment in Singapore.

USS Collaboration
In 2015, Russell Lee and Universal Studios Singapore collaborated in the production of Halloween Horror Nights at Resorts World Sentosa. Stories and characters from the book series were used in the month-long event. It was like experiencing True Singapore Ghost Stories with a Hollywood twist.

Reception 
According to the Singapore Book of Records, the True Singapore Ghost Stories is the best-selling local series by a team of writers, and the all-time best-selling local book series, in Singapore.

The Straits Times mentions "Russell Lee’s True Singapore Ghost Stories has been a mainstay on Singapore bestseller lists since they hit shelves in 1989. The material is just so incredibly rich... You just want to read on". While the South China Morning Post stated that "Russell Lee is Singapore’s most popular writer by a long stretch. His prose is clear and his titles snappy." The Star reports that "True Singapore Ghost Stories Book 1 is Singapore’s all-time number one bestseller".

References

External links
 True Singapore Ghost Stories on the Flame Of The Forest website 

Ghost stories
Supernatural books
Singaporean short story collections
1989 short story collections
1992 short story collections
1994 short story collections
1995 short story collections
1996 short story collections
1997 short story collections
1999 short story collections
2003 short story collections
2004 short story collections
2005 short story collections
2006 short story collections
2007 short story collections
2008 short story collections
2009 short story collections
2010 short story collections
2011 short story collections
2012 short story collections
2013 short story collections